is a Japanese manga series written and illustrated by legendary Japanese mangaka Osamu Tezuka. It was originally serialized in Weekly Shōnen Magazine from 7 July 1974 through 19 March 1978 and was later published into thirteen tankōbon volumes by Kodansha.

In 1977, Mitsume ga Tōru tied with another Tezuka manga, Black Jack, for the Kodansha Manga Award. The manga has since spawned an animated television film, produced by Toei Animation for Nippon TV that aired on 25 August 1985, and five years later, an anime television series produced by Tezuka Productions, which ran on TV Tokyo for a total of 48 episodes from 18 October 1990 until 26 September 1991. The latter series adaptation was planned in the wake of the first anniversary of Tezuka's death on 9 February 1989.

The main character, Hosuke Sharaku, had had appearances outside the manga as a recurring character in Tezuka's Star System, appearing in two television films, One Million-Year Trip: Bander Book (1978) and Undersea Super Train: Marine Express (1979) respectively, and one episode of the series Blue Blink ("A Prisoner at Rose House", 1989). Sharaku also appeared in three video games: Mitsume ga Tōru: The Three-Eyed One Comes Here by Natsume on the MSX in 1989, Mitsume ga Tōru by Tomy on the NES in 1992, Astro Boy: Omega Factor by Sega on the Game Boy Advance (as Astro Boy's arch-enemy) and Astro Boy by Sega on the PlayStation 2 (as an ally to Astro Boy in a sidequest).

Plot
The premise of the story revolves around the main character Hosuke Sharaku ("the Evil Prince" 悪魔のプリンス). Hosuke is the heir apparent to an ancient civilization of three-eyed superhumans who built an advanced civilization long ago. The story sees Hosuke go around solving problems (most often by his own causing) and investigating lost ruins to learn more about his origins. He is often accompanied on these deeds by his best friend Chiyoko Wato.   

On a stormy night, Dr. Kenmochi was visited by a strange woman bearing a child. The woman, who had a third eye on her forehead, encourages him to take care of his child in exchange for her having a "long and prosperous life"  she will want for nothing and ran off from the house. Before Kenmochi could stop her, she was hit head first by a lightning strike, and burned to a flaming cinder. Kenmochi went on to raise the child, named Sharaku, as his own. As the doctor was taking care of Sharaku, he noticed that a third eye was forming on his forehead; after the eye grew, Sharaku began to develop a high intelligence and an evil behavior beyond that of any mortal. To repel any further development from this weird desposition, Kenmochi stuck a cross-shaped bandage on his forehead shutting his third eye, and Sharaku went on to have a mostly normal childhood, bearing a dumb mind and being a strictly obedient person.

Sharaku is frequently bullied for his childishness, and as such the story is also about how he fights back when the cross-shaped bandage that covers his third eye is removed. Hidden behind the bandage is Sharaku's malicious third eye, and the boy's hidden evil genius emerges when it can see.  Sharaku's rivalries with teachers or students are occasionally developed into major plot points.

To learn about his roots, Sharaku must investigate the mysterious ruins that a long lost civilization called the Three-Eyed Ones bequeathed to him. In his worldwide search, which takes both he and Wato-san to locations like Arizona, Easter Island, and Mexico, Sharaku deciphers ancient scriptures and uses gadgets he invents to help solve (or start) problems and mysteries.

Some of the story's appeal is that Osamu Tezuka, the story's author, has Sharaku investigate actual historic ruins that are shrouded in mystery and offer his own unique ideas.

Characters

Main characters 
 Hosuke Sharaku (写楽保介. Voiced by: Kazue Ikura)
 The last survivor of the three-eyed tribe have a third eye on his forehead which gives him astronomical intellect and psychic powers. In addition, "Abutoru-Damuraru-Omunisu-Nomunisu Beru Esu Horimaku" is a phrase in three-eyed script to control the weapon Red Condor.
 His name sounds simply like the Japanese pronunciation of Sherlock Holmes. If his third eye is covered, he becomes a very likeable, nice, clueless little kid.
 Chiyoko Wato (和登千代子. Voiced by: Naoko Matsui)
A classmate of Sharaku who plays as his best friend, mother figure, and love interest. Commonly, she is nicknamed as "Wato-san" (和登さん). She is a self-confident, tomboyish and somewhat violent high school girl. She frequently refers to herself with the Japanese male pronoun 'boku'. Her name is a reference to the assistant of Sherlock Holmes, Watson. She often plays a huge role in thwarting Sharaku's plans for world domination.
 Dr. Kenmochi (犬持教授. Voiced by: Shunsuke Shima)
 The adoptive father of Sharaku. 
 Higeoyaji (ヒゲオヤジ. Voiced by: Kenichi Ogata)
 The owner of a Tokyo ramen shop and a good friend of Kenmochi. 
 Higeoyaji has had to do a fair amount of caring for Sharaku, who can't be left alone when his father is away. Sharaku occasionally helps out in the ramen shop, but his distractable nature and clumsiness usually make more trouble for Higeoyaji. His nickname means 'mustached old man' in English. He is part of the Tezuka Star System as Shunsaku Ban, a famous detective.
 Police Inspector Unmei "Heppoko Inspector" (雲名警部. Voiced by: Kazuo Kumakura)
 A Star System character based on Ludwig van Beethoven, Unmei is a frequent guest in both manga and anime versions of Mitsume ga Tōru. He is a police chief, and is one of the characters who has seen Sharaku as the Three-Eyed One in action. Not much is known about his past or his personality, but he appears to be very dedicated to his work and cool in a crisis.

Other characters
 Sharaku's Mother (Voiced by: Gara Takashima)
 The woman who spawned Sharaku; she was the stranger who left the infant Sharaku under Kenmochi's care in exchange for nothing else and ran away from them, only to immediately be killed head first by a lightning strike. Like his son after her, she has a third eye on her forehead.
 Saburō Kidō (Voiced by: Shō Hayami)
 The leader of the bad group study at the same school of Sharaku and Wato. For bullying Sharaku in early.
 Osamu (Voiced by: Megumi Tano)
 Osamu is an anime-only character based on Tezuka Osamu. He is Sharaku's classmate, and is portrayed as a nervous sort who likes to keep himself out of trouble. At times it has been indicated that Osamu (like the rest of his male classmates) may be interested in Wato romantically. He wears thick, round glasses and has a bulbous nose, and when in uniform is usually seen wearing his black student cap.
 Takashi (Voiced by: Akira Ishida)
 While featuring occasionally in the manga, Takashi is seen far more often in the anime in Sharaku's small circle of friends. He is a little more quick to action, but is meek as well, preventing him from helping Sharaku much when he's being picked on. Takashi has beady black eyes and is fairly tall. He and Osamu are good friends.
 Bankara (Voiced by Toshiharu Sakurai)
 His real name is Bando To Saburo. Captain of the judo club.- A member of the Judo Club, Bankara is Sharaku's classmate and could be considered a member of Kido's group, but truthfully he likes Sharaku and tries to protect him. He is one of the few people who know about Sharaku's Three-Eyed personality. Bankara is tall and heavyset with short black hair, and wears his student cap frayed.
 Skunk Kusai (Voiced by: Fumihiko Tachiki)
 Claiming to Newkirk University professors, but he is actually a thief. He appeared in Astro Boy, most "famously" as the villain in such and in Mitsume ga Tōru where he reprises the same role.
 Bumpuku Fukutaro (Voiced by:  Yusaku Yara)
 Man of mystery that haunts Sharaku. He appeared in the episode "The Villain Bumpuku Appears".
 Noble (Voiced by: Nozomu Sasaki)
 Keeper of the Lake Biwia. Uses super powers in the fight against goblins in the anime, he died from exhaustion after Sharaku told him that he loves Wato.
 Garon (Voiced by: Unshō Ishizuka)
 Aira, Moegi (Voiced by: Yuri Amano)
 A three-eyed mysterious girl who knows the clue of the plant Bolbocc. 
 Pogo, Bogota, Bokor, Ruby (Voiced by: Miyuki Sanae)
 A monkey who can speak human language. She is yearning Sharaku, and help him. 
 Ancient Prince Godaru (Voiced by: Kazue Ikura)
 An ancestor of Sharaku. He is the Prince of Lemuria Kingdom, with a cruel outrageous personality. He possesses the body of Wato, but it is two-eyed, which doesn't give him much power and so he wants to possess the body of Sharaku.
 Princess Shiguana (Voiced by: Naoko Matsui)
 The wife of Godaru and ancestor of Wato. Eventually sealed in the pot the soul dissolved the body of Godaru. 
 Moa (Voiced by: Ikue Ōtani)
 Originally an egg left under Sharaku's care when its mother, a Giant Moa (an extinct species unique to New Zealand) was killed, the little Moa hatched and began living with him. She (gender is ambiguous, but appears to be female) is quite intelligent and loves Sharaku, though Wato isn't fond of the bird. Moa has the ability to fly; though her species has no wings, she can charge up her backside and fly like a rocket when need be.
 When she is older, she is capable of carrying people while flying. Very playful and vocal (though she cannot speak human languages), Moa also has a soft spot for Higeoyaji's gyoza dumplings.

Staff
The following staff is the anime series of 1990.

 Director : Hidehito Ueda
 Series composition : Mayori Sekijima
 Scenario : Mayori Sekijima, Nobuaki Kishima, Toshihisa Arakawa
 Character design : Kazuhiko Udagawa
 Music : Toshiyuki Watanabe
 Sound director : Satoshi Katō
 Animation director : Kazuhiko Udagawa, Eiji Uemura, Teruo Handa, Toshi Shishikura
 Art director : Kazuo Okada
 Producer : Toshishige Arai (Nihon Keizaisha), Kuniaki Ōnishi (Gakken), Mitsunobu Onaga (TV Tokyo)
 Planning : Takamasa Matsuya (Tezuka Productions), Hideki Furuoka (Gakken), Susumu Gotōda (Nihon Keizaisha)

Theme songs
Opening theme

 Singer : Tomoko Tokugaki
 Lyricist : Kumiko Aoki
 Composer : Yasuo Kosugi
 Arranger : Kazuo Nobuta

Ending theme
 (eps 1 – 47)
 Singer : Anna Nakajima
 Lyricist : Kayoko Fuyumori
 Composer : Gōji Tsuno
 Arranger: Kazuo Nobuta
 {final (48th) episode}
 Singer : CHIEMY
 Lyricist : Kumiko Aoki
 Composer : Yasuo Kosugi
 Arranger : Saburō Makino

Episodes

See also
 Mitsume ga Tōru – A NES video game issued in 1992.
 The New Adventures of Kimba The White Lion – Predecessor. The first was in October 1989, and was broadcast as a memorial project for Osamu Tezuka same as this work.
 Moomin – Preceding program. Same as this work, a program which was usually broadcast even in the Gulf War, but more known than this work.
 Moero! Top Striker – Successor. One of affected programs by the Gulf War in 1991 same as this work, the story of a multinational team appears.

References

External links
 
 

1974 manga
1985 anime films
1985 television films
1985 films
1990 anime television series debuts
1992 video games

Shōnen manga
Kodansha manga
Winner of Kodansha Manga Award (Shōnen)

Osamu Tezuka manga
Osamu Tezuka anime
Tezuka Productions

Anime television films
Dissociative identity disorder in television
Toei Animation films
TV Tokyo original programming